Live At The Annandale is The Bronx's first available DVD, it showcases a full concert that was held at the Annandale Hotel in Sydney, Australia and released not long after the concert. The DVD is unique in that it was shot by an employee of the hotel with his own mini DV camera. The DVD features the entire show shot by one camera without any edits. The DVD packaging boasts "No edits, No cuts, That shit's over rated." The DVD has also had a minor release in numbers in the United States.

Track listing
All tracks by The Bronx.
"I Got Chills"
"Heart Attack American"
"Gun Without Bullets"
"White Tar"
"Cobra Lucha"
"Bats!"
"Stop The Bleeding"
"Notice Of Eviction"
"The Needle & The Damage Done (Neil Young)"
"They Will Kill Us All (Without Mercy)"
"Private Affair (The Saints)"
"False Alarm"
"Kill My Friends"
"All This Is"
"They Will Kill Us All (Without Mercy)" - video clip

Personnel
Jorma Vik	 - 	drums
Matt Caughthran	 - 	vocals
Joby J. Ford	 - 	Guitar
James Tweedy	 - 	Bass

The Bronx (band) albums
2005 live albums
2005 video albums
Live video albums